Hamdan Al-Ruwaili (born 14 March 1995) is a Saudi Arabian professional footballer who plays as a right-back for Al-Orobah.

Career
Al-Ruwaili began his career in the youth setups of Al-Entelaq. He then joined Al-Orobah in 2013. He made his first-team debut during the 2015–16 season. He spent 3 seasons at the club and made 53 appearances and scored twice. On 3 July 2018, Al-Ruwaili joined Pro League side Al-Taawoun on a 2-year contract. He made his debut 25 December 2018 in the league match against city rivals Al-Raed. On 29 April 2019 during the league match against Al-Hilal, Al-Ruwaili was injured and stretchered off the pitch. On 7 May 2019, Al-Taawoun announced that Al-Ruwaili suffered from a torn ACL. On 9 January 2020, Al-Ruwaili extended his contract with Al-Taawoun until 2023. He was released by Al-Taawoun on 21 December 2021. On 21 January 2022, Al-Ruwaili rejoined Al-Orobah.

Career statistics

Club

Honours
Al-Taawoun
King Cup: 2019

References

External links 
 

1995 births
Living people
Saudi Arabian footballers
Al-Entelaq SC players
Al-Orobah FC players
Al-Taawoun FC players
Saudi Professional League players
Saudi First Division League players
Association football defenders
Association football fullbacks
People from Al-Jawf Province